Stephen Richard Wright (born 26 August 1954) is an English radio personality and disc jockey, credited with introducing the zoo format on British radio, known for its zany, multi-personality approach. He presented Steve Wright in the Afternoon for 12 years on BBC Radio 1 and 23 years on BBC Radio 2, two of the BBC's national radio stations, the latter being the most popular station in the United Kingdom, ending on 30 September 2022. He continues to present his Sunday Love Songs weekend mid-morning show on Radio 2. On BBC Television Wright has hosted Home Truths, The Steve Wright People Show, Auntie's TV Favourites, Top of the Pops and TOTP2. Wright has won awards, including Best DJ of the Year as voted by the Daily Mirror Readers Poll and by Smash Hits in 1994. In 1998 he was awarded TRIC Personality of the Year for his radio programmes.

Early life and career
Born in Greenwich, South London, the elder of two boys in a working-class family, Wright was raised in New Cross. His childhood ambition was to work in the entertainment business. His father, Richard Wright, was a tailor and the manager of the Burton's store in Trafalgar Square. Wright was a quiet child, and never very scholarly. He was educated at Eastwood High School for Boys, near Southend-on-Sea, Essex. Steve occasionally broadcast a nascent radio show over the school speaker system from the school stock cupboard. Wright originally joined the BBC staff in the early 1970s working as a returns clerk in the Gramophone Library in Egton House, opposite Broadcasting House, in London  before leaving to start broadcasting in 1976 at Thames Valley Radio Radio 210 in Reading, Berkshire alongside Mike Read. In 1979 Wright got his big break at Radio Luxembourg, where he presented his own nightly show, presenting a Saturday evening show, then Saturday morning.

BBC Radio 1
In 1980, Wright joined BBC Radio 1, taking over a Saturday evening slot before moving to Saturday mornings later that year.

Steve Wright in the Afternoon (March 1981 to December 1993) 
Wright moved to daytime radio with Steve Wright in the Afternoon in 1981, later introducing the zoo format to the UK.

In 1984, Wright took over a Sunday morning show entitled Steve Wright on Sunday, which meant he presented weekday afternoons Mondays to Thursdays, with Mark Page and Paul Jordan presenting Friday afternoon's show. In 1986 his Sunday morning show ended, and he returned to five afternoons a week.

The original incarnation of Steve Wright in the Afternoon ran from 1981 to 1993 on BBC Radio 1. The show became known in its Radio 1 incarnation for its cast of telephone characters created and performed by Gavin McCoy, Peter Dickson, Richard Easter and Phil Cornwell. Like his mentor, Kenny Everett, Wright went out of his way to be irreverent, including stories taken from the Weekly World News. The success led to a hit single, I'll Be Back, released under the name Arnee and the Terminaters. In later years the style changed, dumping most of the characters and instead having a "zoo" format, with spoof guests and comedy sketches. A "posse" of producers and radio staff joined in. This format was new to British radio and marked the beginning of the marginalisation (and eventual departure) of several established Radio 1 DJs over the years that followed. 

The Smiths' 1986 hit single "Panic" was inspired by Wright playing "I'm Your Man" by Wham! following a news report about the Chernobyl nuclear disaster on his show. Johnny Marr and Morrissey, who had been listening to the broadcast, viewed this as an insensitive and disrespectful act.

Radio 1 Breakfast (January 1994 to April 1995) 
Wright and his Posse moved to The Radio 1 Breakfast Show in 1994. He resigned from the Breakfast Show in 1995 due to differences with the BBC Radio 1 management; he was unhappy with the plummeting listening figures of the station due to its restructuring under new controller Matthew Bannister, which led to many of the more established DJs leaving, or being sacked, around this time.

Commercial radio
Wright was picked up by the new station Talk Radio in 1995, where he presented a Saturday morning show. He presented various syndicated shows on Sunday mornings on a number of other British commercial stations.

BBC World Service
Wright joined the BBC World Service on 5 January 1999, presenting a 1 hour programme, Wright Around The World  This show ran every Saturday afternoon until the final show on 25th October 2003.  This meant that he was now on BBC Radio 7 days a week.

BBC Radio 2 
He joined BBC Radio 2 in March 1996, where he began presenting Steve Wright's Saturday Show (1996–1999) and Steve Wright's Sunday Love Songs (1996–present), and his afternoon show beginning in July 1999. In 2006, Wright was said to earn £440,000 a year at Radio 2.

Steve Wright in the Afternoon (July 1999 to September 2022)
In mid-1999 following a shake-up at Radio 2, Steve Wright in the Afternoon was revived, with Wright taking over this slot from Ed Stewart. Jonathan Ross took over Wright's Saturday morning slot.

Wright presented his Radio 2 version of Steve Wright in the Afternoon on weekday afternoons from 2pm to 5pm, alongside Tim Smith and Janey Lee Grace, who have both also occasionally appeared as relief presenters on the station, as well as traffic reporter Bobbie Pryor. Another frequent contributor, "The Old Woman", was played by Joyce Frost who died in November 2016.

On 1 July 2022 Wright announced that the show would end in September, to be replaced by a new show with Scott Mills. Wright would remain on Radio 2 to continue hosting Sunday Love Songs, along with a new Serious Jockin podcast, seasonal specials and other projects.  The final show was broadcast on 30 September 2022, with Wright playing "Radio Ga Ga" by Queen as his last record.

Sunday Love Songs (March 1996 to present)
Sunday Love Songs, which Wright presents solo between 9am and 11am, features a blend of classic love songs, dedications and real-life romance stories.

In 2013 it was revealed that the show was recorded on a Friday afternoon. The BBC Trust's editorial standards committee said the failure to inform listeners breached guidelines on accuracy and interacting with the audience.

Career outside radio
Wright presented a BBC TV series, The Steve Wright People Show, from 1994 to 1995. His next stint in television was as the narrator and writer of the retro pop show Top of the Pops 2 between 1997 and 2009. The last episode of TOTP2 he presented was the Michael Jackson special broadcast on 27 June 2009; Mark Radcliffe presented the next episode, which was the 2009 Christmas special broadcast on 23 December 2009.

UK Chart Hits
Whilst a radio presenter on BBC Radio 1, Wright was involved in a number of UK chart hits with members of his Afternoon Posse (the drive time radio team) including the UK Top 10 hit "I'll Be Back" which was performed in character by Mike Woolmans as 'Arnee' and which featured Wright as one of his backing band, 'the Terminaters', on the 29 August 1991 edition of BBC One's Top of the Pops.
 Young Steve & The Afternoon Boys - "I'm Alright" (RCA Records 1982, single) UK Singles Chart number 40
 Steve Wright And The Sisters Of Soul - "Get Some Therapy" (RCA Records 1983, single) UK Singles Chart number 75 
 Steve Wright - "The Gay Cavalieros (The Story So Far...)" (MCA 1984, single) UK Singles Chart number 61 in December 1984.
 Mr. Angry With Steve Wright - "I'm So Angry" (MCA 1985, single) UK Singles Chart number 90 in August 1985.
 Arnee and the Terminaters - "I'll Be Back" (Epic Records 1991, single) UK Singles Chart number 5

In addition to these records, Mr Food's number 62 single from 1990 "And That's Before Me Tea!", was based on a jingle by Dave Sanderson recorded for Wright's afternoon show.

Personal life 
Little is known about Wright's personal life. He was married to Cyndi Robinson until they divorced in 1999, and has two children. He is allergic to feathers and penicillin.

Bibliography
Steve Wright Steve Wright's Book of the Amazing But True: Trivia for the Connoisseur, Pocket Books (1995) 
Steve Wright Just Keep Talking: Story of the Chat Show,  ‎ Simon & Schuster (1997) 
Steve Wright Steve Wright's Book of Factoids, HarperCollins Publishers (UK), (2005) 
Steve Wright Steve Wright's Further Factoids, HarperCollins Publishers (UK), (2007)

References

External links

Steve Wright's Sunday Love Songs (BBC Radio 2)
Radio Rewind: Steve Wright – profile, pics and audio clips – BBC Radio 1
Radio Rewind: Steve Wright – profile, pics and audio clips – BBC Radio 2
'Sid the Manager' site
archive.org: Steve Wright in the Afternoon Airchecks

1954 births
Living people
English radio DJs
English radio presenters
BBC Radio 2 presenters
BBC Radio 1 presenters
People from Greenwich
Radio Luxembourg (English) presenters
Top of the Pops presenters